Anti-Everything is a punk band from Trinidad and Tobago. Anti-Everything is the only punk band in Trinidad and Tobago.

History 
Anti-Everything was founded in 2000 in St. Joseph, about 11 km east of the capital Port of Spain. At this time all members still were teenagers, and the band name was chosen due to a general attitude of denial. In the early 2010's singer Bryan Khan und guitarist Randy Ali moved to Europe; since then songs are mainly developed through online cooperation and recorded when temporarily all members are in Trinidad. 2021 Khan relocated to Trinidad while Randy Ali still lives in Belgium.

In 2019, Anti-Everything was the first Trinidadian rock band to complete a European tour (through Belgium, France, Germany, the Netherlands and Spain). In 2022 the band completed another European tour which lead through ten countries.

Style 
Anti-Everything play punk rock with elements of alternative rock. The band names several punk bands as influential - old school (Black Flag, Minor Threat) and new school (Pennywise, Strike Anywhere). In addition, the band names calypso interpreters as influential as in the past they were not afraid to broach controversial issues which were tabooed in public at that time. References to reggae, dub and ska can be found, and occasionally a steel pan is being used.
The lyrics of Anti-Everything mainly deal with political and social conflicts, often touching their home country Trinidad and Tobago. A minor part of their lyrics deals with personal topics such as the search for an identity, or has a pure fun character.

Discography

Albums 
 2009: The International Conspiracy to Push You Down (Boatshrimp Records)
 2011: Children of a Globalised World (Boatshrimp Records)

EPs 
 2010: Decision 2010 (Boatshrimp Records)
 2010: Please Do Your Job (Properly) (Boatshrimp Records)
 2015: A Folly of Its Own (Boatshrimp Records)
 2017: Harbour Ties (Boatshrimp Records)
 2018: Congestión (Boatshrimp Records)
 2020: Fowl Fete (Boatshrimp Records)
 2021: COAGX (Boatshrimp Records)

Sampler contributions 
 2007: Boatshrimp Records Sampler Volume 1 (Boatshrimp Records, track "Way Too Long")
 2007: Boatshrimp Records Sampler Volume 2 (Boatshrimp Records, tracks "Jimmy" and "Crowded")
 2007: Greenlight Network Vol. 1 (Greenlight Network, track "The Way We Choose to Live Our Lives")
 2011: Punktology Vol. 1 (Punk Outlaw Records, tracks "New Generation" and "Ratchet Design")
 2012: Hardcore 4 Syria (Hardcore 4 Syria, track "Gravity On Hold")

References

External links 
 Official Website
 Video interview with Anti-Everything

Musical groups established in 2000
Trinidad and Tobago rock music groups
Trinidad and Tobago punk rock groups